Ecphantus or Ecphantos or Ephantus is a shadowy Greek pre-Socratic philosopher. He may not have actually existed. He is identified as a Pythagorean of the 4th century BCE, and as a supporter of the heliocentric theory. Described as from Syracuse, this may or may not be the same figure as the attested Ecphantus of Croton.

Ecphantus accepted the existence of atoms. He accepts the existence of void, empty space. Ecphantus maintained that the Cosmos is made of atoms and there is only one Cosmos (Universe) governed by providence (πρόνοια). He is the first of the Pythagoreans to attribute physical substance to the Pythagorean units (see Unit-point atomism). 

Ecphantus, like Heraclides of Pontus, believed that the Earth turns around its centre from west to towards east, like a wheel, as if it has an axis, the state.

Notes

External links
 Cosmovisions

4th-century BC Greek people
4th-century BC philosophers
Ancient Greek astronomers
Ancient Syracusans
People whose existence is disputed
Presocratic philosophers
Pythagoreans of Magna Graecia